Ciudad Benito Juárez, or simply Juárez, is the name of a city located in the eastern part of the Monterrey metropolitan area in the state of Nuevo León, Mexico. It is the seat of the municipality of the same name. Ciudad Benito Juárez had a 2010 census population of 256,970 persons  and is the eighth-largest city in Nuevo León. It shares borders with the municipalities of Pesquería to the north; to the south with Santiago; to the east with Cadereyta Jiménez; and to the west with Guadalupe.

Origin of the name
The city was named in honor of 19th century Mexican president Benito Juárez.

History
Founded as "Hacienda de San José" or "Hacienda San José de los González" on June 15, 1604. The Governor of the state of Nuevo León, Martín de Zavala, granted the lands for settlement to Bernabé González Hidalgo on April 1, 1642.

The congress of the state decreed on March 1, 1850, the foundation of a new district with the name "El Rosario", within then "Hacienda de Villa". This new district was part of the municipality of Cadereyta until 1868.

On December 30, 1868, General Jerónimo Treviño, governor of the state of Nuevo León, decreed that the "Villa de Juárez" (Juarez's Village) will be founded and recognized in the same area "El Rosario" occupied. As all of the other present-day municipalities of the state, Juárez was part of the system of villages used in the 19th century. These villages were founded in order to exploit the natural resources of the zone.

Villa de Juárez was granted the title of city in May, 1988 with the name of "Ciudad Benito Juárez".

Present day
The city is going under a heavy process of urbanization and construction of houses and residential complexes, as all of the inner municipalities part of the Monterrey metropolitan area have no more room available.

Geography
The municipality has an extension of 277.8 km2 and located at an altitude of 403 meters above the sea level. The territory is mountainous, but with not important elevations, with around 70% of plain or semi-plain lands and 30% of rugged terrain. The lands are crossed by River La Silla, that joins River Santa Catarina in a place called "Las adjuntas". River La Silla joins River San Juan in the municipality of Cadereyta Jiménez.

Climate
With a BSH climate, dry and hot. Juárez's annual average temperature is 22° Celsius, and its annual rain precipitation is 400 mm. Dominant winds comes from the north.

Government
Ciudad Benito Juárez is a municipality governed by a democratic elected Presidente Municipal (Municipal President or Mayor) for a period of 3 years with no right to reelection. The political environment is one of civility.

The City Council of Juárez (Cabildo de Juárez) is an organ integrated by the Mayor, the Regidores and the Síndicos. The Mayor is the executor of the determinations of the City Council and the person directly in charge of the public municipal administration. The Regidores represent the community and their mission is to collectively define the city policies in all the subjects affecting it. The Síndicos are in charge of watching and legally defend the city interests, as well as in charge of watching the City Treasury status and the municipal patrimony.

The current Mayor of Juárez is Rodolfo Ambriz Oviedo from the National Action Party (PAN), who was elected in the past municipal election on July 1, 2012, and will remain in office until 2015.

The political parties with representation in the city are the Institutional Revolutionary Party or PRI, the National Action Party or PAN, the Party of the Democratic Revolution or PRD, the Labor Party or PT, the Green Party, Convergence, Social Democratic and Farmer Alternative and Nueva Alianza.

References

External links
Government of Ciudad Benito Juárez, Official website

Monterrey metropolitan area
Populated places in Nuevo León
1604 establishments in New Spain
Populated places established in 1604